Lodi Transit Station, or simply Lodi station, is an intermodal transit facility in Lodi, California. It serves the San Joaquins rail line, is the hub for the local Lodi GrapeLine bus service and is also served by other intercity buses. It is located at 24 South Sacramento Street in Lodi, California.

In fiscal year 2019, Lodi was the 59th-busiest of Amtrak's 73 California stations, boarding or detraining an average of about 30 passengers daily.

History
Rail service to the area began in 1869, when the Central Pacific Railroad established a depot where the present station stands. Local landowning families had donated the site of the town eventually known as Lodi to the railroad as an incentive to build there. The original building burned down in 1906, and Southern Pacific Railroad, the successor to the Central Pacific, erected a new colonnade-style depot in 1907 half a block to the north. When Amtrak took over passenger rail service in 1971, the Lodi station closed.

In 1993, Amtrak studied the possibility of reopening stops in California's Central Valley, and interest grew in restoring Lodi station. The San Joaquin made a ceremonial stop there in 1999, and the city commenced plans to create an intermodal transit hub, Lodi Transit Station. The $2.3 million project involved moving the 1907 railroad building to its present location on South Sacramento Street to accommodate a new passenger platform, and additions including bus bays, a waiting room, a clock tower, and a Gateway Arch. Full rail service began on March 18, 2002. In 2011, the station saw new additions funded by the American Recovery and Reinvestment Act.

Rail service was temporarily suspended between March 2020 and October 2021 due to the COVID-19 pandemic.

References

External links

Amtrak stations in San Joaquin County, California
Amtrak Station
Former Southern Pacific Railroad stations in California
Railway stations in the United States opened in 1907
Railway stations closed in 1971
Railway stations in the United States opened in 2002
1907 establishments in California